Talk to Your Daughter is a blues rock album by Robben Ford, released in 1988. The album's cover version of the Albert King classic "Born Under a Bad Sign" was used as a supporting soundtrack in the Clint Eastwood movie Pink Cadillac.

Track listing
 "Talk to Your Daughter" (J. B. Lenoir) – 4:06
 "Wild About You (Can't Hold Out Much Longer)" (Walter Jacobs) – 3:46
 "Help the Poor" (Charles Singleton) – 5:37
 "Ain't Got Nothin' but the Blues" (Duke Ellington, Larry Fotine, Don George) – 4:34
 "Born Under a Bad Sign" (William Bell, Booker T. Jones) – 3:45
 "I Got Over It" (Ike Turner) – 3:22
 "Revelation" (Russell Ferrante, Lorraine Perry) – 6:21
 "Getaway" (Robben Ford) – 4:17
 "Can't Let Her Go" (Ford) – 5:36

Charts

Personnel
 Robben Ford – guitars, lead vocals
 Russell Ferrante – Yamaha GS-1, synthesizers, piano
 Roscoe Beck – four- and six-string bass, vocals
 Vinnie Colaiuta – drums

Additional personnel
 Vince Denham – saxophones on "I Got Over It"
 Brandon Fields – saxophones on "Wild About You (Can't Hold Out Much Longer)"
 Mark Ford – harmonica on "Can't Let Her Go" and "I Got Over It"
 Brian Mann – synthesizers on "Help the Poor"
 Bill Payne – additional synthesizers on "Can't Let Her Go"
 Jeff Porcaro – drums on "I Got Over It"

Production
 Scott Ferguson – producer
 Robben Ford – producer
 Jeff Hendrickson – mixing, overdub engineer
 Toby Wright – mixing
 Mark Creamer – mixing, tracking engineer, overdub engineer
 Geoff Gillette – mixing
 Howie Weinberg – mastering
 David Hentschel – tracking engineer, overdub engineer
 Shep Lonsdale – tracking engineer, overdub engineer
 Duncan Aldridge, Hal Sacks, Rick Slater, John Slattery – overdub engineers
 Bob Fuojinski, Bob Levy, Larry Mah, Micajah Ryan, Bret Swain – assistant engineers
 Joan Parker – production coordinator
 Timothy White, Mike Russ – photography

References

Robben Ford albums
1988 albums
Warner Records albums